Psilogramma jordana is a moth of the family Sphingidae. It is known from Fiji.

References

Psilogramma
Moths described in 1905
Endemic fauna of Fiji
Moths of Fiji